The Catalan Institute of Nanotechnology (ICN) (NanoCAT or Institut Català de Nanotecnologia) was established in 2003 by the Catalan government and the Autonomous University of Barcelona (UAB), with the aim of attracting skilled international researchers to create a hub for nanoscience and nanotechnology research.

Research areas
Research focused in the following areas:
 Synthesis and applications of nanoparticles and nanotubes
 Design and synthesis of macromolecules for the integration of nanodevices
 Magnetism of thin films and spintronics
 Imaging and manipulation of atoms and molecules
 Theory of surfaces and inter-phases
 Interaction of biomaterials with inorganic matter

Following collaborations between the ICN and the Spanish government's Centre for Research in Nanoscience and Nanotechnology (CIN2), the ICN and the Spanish Research Council (CSIC) signed a memorandum of understanding of their official collaboration in 2006. This agreement was formalised in 2011, when CSIC representatives joined the ICN's board of patrons, and then in 2013, when the ICN changed its name to the Catalan Institute of Nanoscience and Nanotechnology (ICN2).

References

Nanotechnology institutions
Autonomous University of Barcelona